The Bonneville House is a historic house at 318 North 7th Street in Fort Smith, Arkansas.  It is a two-story brick structure, with a metal hip roof and a brick foundation.  Built in 1880, its styling is predominantly Second Empire, with elaborate window hoods, heavy paired brackets in the eaves, and a full-width porch with turned balusters and posts with finely-detailed capitals.  In addition to its locally distinctive architecture, the house is historically significant as the home of explorer Benjamin Bonneville.

The house has been restored and is available for event rentals.

The house was listed on the National Register of Historic Places in 1971.

Bonneville House Association
The Bonneville House Association consists of a Board of Directors and Executive Director to serve for the preservation, upkeep, and operation of The Bonneville House as a historical landmark and event venue.

See also
National Register of Historic Places listings in Sebastian County, Arkansas

References

External links
 Bonneville House - official site

Houses on the National Register of Historic Places in Arkansas
Houses completed in 1880
Houses in Fort Smith, Arkansas
National Register of Historic Places in Sebastian County, Arkansas